Aging Research and Drug Discovery (ARDD) is a non-profit conference which is organized by University of Copenhagen and Columbia University every year at University of Copenhagen.

History 
The first ARDD conference was held in 2014 at Basel, Switzerland. Then, this conference was known as Aging Forum and it was a part of MipTec and Basel Life Congresses. The conference was intended to bring together the Pharmaceutical industry, leading academics, Investors and Startups.

References 

Life extension organizations
Life extension
Ageing
Columbia University
University of Copenhagen